Reach the Rock is a 1998 American comedy drama film directed by William Ryan and starring William Sadler and Alessandro Nivola. It was the last film to be written and produced by John Hughes before his death.

Premise
A small-town troublemaker (Alessandro Nivola), directionless and alienated, ends up spending a night in a jail cell, where he and the police chief (William Sadler) engage in a battle of wills and wit.

Cast
 William Sadler as Quinn
 Alessandro Nivola as Robin
 Bruce Norris as Ernie
 Brooke Langton as	Lise 
 Norman Reedus as Danny
 Karen Sillas as Donna
 Richard Hamilton as Ed

Production
Writer/producer John Hughes originally offered the Reach the Rock script to director Chris Columbus at the same time he offered him Home Alone. Columbus opted to direct the latter.

The soundtrack featured a compilation of Chicago-based post-rock artists, among them Tortoise and associated acts Bundy K. Brown, The Sea and Cake and John McEntire. It was released on Hefty Records, a label owned and operated by John Hughes III, the son of John Hughes. The film gets its title from a song by the band Havana 3am.

References

External links

American comedy-drama films
American independent films
Films produced by John Hughes (filmmaker)
Films with screenplays by John Hughes (filmmaker)
Gramercy Pictures films
Universal Pictures films
1998 independent films
1998 films
1998 comedy-drama films
1990s English-language films
1990s American films
1998 directorial debut films
Films set in Chicago